Windhill and Wrose is a ward, and Wrose is a civil parish, both in the metropolitan borough of the City of Bradford, West Yorkshire, England.  The ward and parish contain ten listed buildings that are recorded in the National Heritage List for England.  Of these, two are listed at Grade II*, the middle of the three grades, and the others are at Grade II, the lowest grade.  The listed buildings consist of houses and cottages, a school later used for other purposes, and a public house.


Key

Buildings

References

Citations

Sources

 

Lists of listed buildings in West Yorkshire